The Daughters of Jesus (abbreviated as F.I.) is a Roman Catholic congregation of Religious Sisters founded on 8 December 1871 in Salamanca, Spain, by Candida Maria of Jesus (1845-1912). Known as Jesuitinas (or Jesuitesses) in Spain, their work is primarily educational, and includes the administration of schools and colleges. The congregation is devoted to education in all its forms, and is inspired by the spirituality of Ignatius of Loyola, also offering the Ignatian Spiritual Exercises to women and girls.

History

Candida, born Juana Josefa Cipitria y Barriola in the Basque town of Andoain, Gipuzkoa, went to Salamanca as a young girl to help support her family. She worked as a servant in various homes. Cipitria was deeply affected, however, by the depth of poverty she saw in a society undergoing the social effects of the Industrial Revolution in her country. She would spend whatever free time she had helping the poor, even at the risk of losing her employment.

Seeking to find God's will for herself in this, Cipitria said she was led to founding this congregation through a vision of Jesus she experienced on Good Friday of 1869. Two years later, together with five other women, the congregation was established, at which time the foundress, like her companions, took the religious name by which she is now known. They were assisted in this by Jesuit priest Miguel José Herranz.

The congregation expanded rapidly in Spain, receiving formal approval by Pope Leo XIII on 31 July 1901. Within ten years, the foundress was able to begin their first foreign mission in Brazil, founding a school there. This was later followed by a mission to China in 1931.

Current status
Since then, the sisters of the congregation have continued their work of evangelization through education, and today can be found in 17 countries. In addition to Spain they include: Argentina, Bolivia, Brazil, Colombia, Cuba, China, the Dominican Republic, Italy, Japan, Mozambique, Philippines, Taiwan and Venezuela.

The foundress was beatified in 1996 by Pope John Paul II, along with another early member of the congregation, María Antonia Bandrés Elósegui. Candida was canonized by Pope Benedict XVI in 2010.

References

External links
Hijas de Jesús official website
Hijas de Jesús Philippines

1871 establishments in Spain
Catholic teaching orders
Daughters of Jesus, Spain
Religious organizations established in 1871
Women's congregations following Ignatian spirituality
Women in Spain